Ola Sven Halén (born 12 February 1977) is a Swedish metal vocalist, currently with the melodic power metal band Shadows Past. Between 2002 and 2010, he was the lead singer of the Stockholm-based power metal band Insania.

He has written four solo records under the Shadows Past moniker, on which he plays all guitars, bass and keyboards himself, apart from singing. As of 2004/2005 his Shadows Past project is also an active band. Additionally, he has also written and recorded an album of pop songs, called Kind Of Weird.

He cites his main vocal influences as Michael Kiske (Helloween), Oliver Hartmann (ex-At Vance) and former bandmate Dimitri Keiski.

Discography

Shadows Past
 Idleness, pt. I (2000)
 Agony (2001)
 Idleness, pt. II (2002)
 Idleness, pt. III (2004)
 Blown Away (demo, 2006)
 Perfect Chapter (demo, 2009)

Insania
 Fantasy - A New Dimension (2003)
 Agony - Gift Of Life (2007)

Solo
 Kind Of Weird (2004)
 Nackskott (2016)
 Idleness (2020)

External links
http://www.shadowspast.com
http://www.myspace.com/shadowspastofficial
http://www.myspace.com/olahalen

1977 births
Living people
Seventh Wonder members
21st-century Swedish singers
21st-century Swedish male singers